"Girl in Saskatoon" is a song co-written by Johnny Cash with Johnny Horton and originally recorded by Cash for Columbia.

It was released as a single (Columbia 4-41920, with "Locomotive Man" on the opposite side). in December 1960, the same month Sun Records released "Oh, Lonesome Me" / "Life Goes On" (Sun 355).

U.S. Billboard picked the song "Girl in Saskatoon" as one of the "Spotlight winners of the week", giving it four stars that corresponded to a "very strong sales potential". The review called the song "another fine folkish effort by Cash" and continued:

Nevertheless, the song didn't chart on Billboard at all:

On the Cash Box country singles chart, "Girl in Saskatoon" reached number 25 during its nine weeks stay.

Later the song was included on Johnny Cash's albums "Heart of Cash" (1968) & "More of Old Golden Throat" (1969).

Background 

John M. Alexander writes in his book The Man in Song: A Discographic Biography of Johnny Cash:

Track listing

References

External links 
 "Girl in Saskatoon" on the Johnny Cash official website

Johnny Cash songs
1960 songs
1960 singles
Columbia Records singles
Songs written by Johnny Cash
Songs written by Johnny Horton